Water Orton railway station serves Water Orton in Warwickshire, near Coleshill, England. It is owned by Network Rail, and managed by West Midlands Trains. However, no West Midlands Trains stop there; it is only served by CrossCountry services.

History 

The station was resited in August 1908. Although the distance saved was only a mile-and-a-quarter, the junctions at Water Orton and Kingsbury could be taken at a much higher speed than the original one at Whitacre. The line from Whitacre to Kingsbury is used by only a few trains a week.

Facilities
The station is unstaffed and has no ticketing facilities, so passengers requiring a ticket must purchase one in advance or from the conductor on the train.

Platform layout 

The station is known to be a bottleneck for many CrossCountry services, with stopping Leicester to Birmingham, all Birmingham to Leicester and services from the North east to Birmingham all using one platform. However, resolving this is not easy and proposals have been put forward to build a new station at Water Orton to relieve capacity constraints through the station.

Platform 1 is used for stopping trains to Leicester and Birmingham, whilst platform 2 is used for trains towards Derby, of which only one calls per day.

Services 
Services are mainly every two hours to Birmingham New Street and Leicester, with additional services in the peaks. The last train to New Street of the day departs at 16:02. 

There is generally one train a day Monday-Friday to Derby via Tamworth; one also calls in the opposite direction.
There is no Sunday service.

References

External links 

 Water Orton station at warwickshirerailways.com
 A history of the station within a National context at History
 Rail Around Birmingham and the West Midlands: Water Orton railway station

Railway stations in Warwickshire
DfT Category F2 stations
Former Midland Railway stations
Railway stations in Great Britain opened in 1842
Railway stations in Great Britain opened in 1908
Railway stations served by CrossCountry
Railway stations in Great Britain not served by their managing company